Jöns Månsson i Böle (4 April 176928 May 1867) was a Swedish carpenter and decorative painter based in Forsa socken in Hälsingland.

Månsson was born in Myssjö socken in Jämtland. He moved to Forsa socken in 1789 and was married the following year to Cecilia Andersdotter, a carpenter's daughter. They settled in her home village of Böle. Månsson began working as a painter in or before 1792, and was active for roughly half a century. According to oral tradition he was also a carpenter by trade.

As a decorative painter of furniture his regular motif was flowers and leaves, usually on a blue background. He would also make decorative "Forsa doors" in rococo-style, painted in white with thick, protruding door panels. The light blue tint used by Månnson was a mixture of indigo dye and white lead. For decorative painting he would also use darker shades of blue, from pure indigo or prussian blue, a dark red based on hematite, as well as orange and yellow from cinnabar and yellow ochre respectively. He would use techniques such as marbleizing and graining with skill.

The collections of Hälsinglands museum include an armoire painted by Månsson. It bears his signature and the year 1800 marked with graphite.

References

Bibliography

External links 
 Jöns Månsson on digitaltmuseum.org

1769 births
1867 deaths
18th-century Swedish painters
18th-century Swedish male artists
19th-century Swedish painters
Swedish male painters